MV American Century is a very large diesel-powered Lake freighter owned and operated by the American Steamship Company. This vessel was built in 1981 at Bay Shipbuilding Company, Sturgeon Bay, Wisconsin, and included self-unloading technology.

History 
The ship was built for Oglebay Norton Corporation in 1981 and named Columbia Star. The name Columbia was selected for the brig Columbia that sailed through the St. Mary's Falls Canal carrying the first load of iron ore shipped through the canal. Star was commonly used by Oglebay Norton. American Century made its first voyage in May 1981 to on-load iron ore in Silver Bay, Minnesota. American Steamship Company acquired American Century in 2006.

References 

1981 ships
Great Lakes freighters
Ships built in Sturgeon Bay, Wisconsin